Firiplaka or Firiplaka Beach is a beach situated at the southern side in Milos Island, Greece between the other beaches of Provatas (West) and Tsigrado (East). It is one of the most popular beach on the island. The beach is extensive with majestic towering volcanic cliffs, snow-grey fine sand and white pebbles and shallow turquoise waters. There are umbrellas and sunbeds and a bar hut. There is also a huge rock with a cave under it in the water near the shore and it was sculptured out from a volcanic a long time ago. The access to the beach is possible by your own vehicle, taxi, bus or even boat which goes around the island from the port of Adamas. The largest part of the road is asphalt, however the last part of it, is a gravel paved driveway.

See also 
 Sarakiniko Beach
 Arkoudes
 The Catacombs of Milos
 Plaka, Milos

References

External links 
 http://www.greeka.com/cyclades/milos/milos-beaches/milos-firiplaka.htm
 http://milos-island.info/en/paralies26.htm

Milos
Populated places in Milos (regional unit)
Municipalities of the South Aegean
Beaches of Greece